Dead Negro may refer to:

Dead Negro Draw, a stream in Texas
Dead Negro Hollow, a valley in Tennessee